Petra Rampre (born 20 January 1980) is a Slovenian former professional tennis player.

In her career, she won eight singles and five doubles titles on the ITF Circuit. On 30 April 2012, she reached her best singles ranking of world No. 151. On 20 November 2000, she peaked at No. 84 in the WTA doubles rankings.

Illness
Rampre developed alopecia universalis and lost all her hair within three weeks; she utilises bandannas to cover the result.

Biography
Rampre began playing tennis at age ten with her family, and preferred hard or grass courts. Her father, Daniel, is a singer and musician; mother, Berta, is an administrator; she has a younger brother, Aljaz.

Rampre played her last match on the professional circuit in 2016.

WTA career finals

Doubles: 1 (runner-up)

ITF Circuit finals

Singles: 15 (8 titles, 7 runner-ups)

Doubles: 17 (5–12)

Singles performance timeline

References

External links
 
 
 

1980 births
Living people
Slovenian expatriate sportspeople in Germany
Slovenian expatriate sportspeople in the United States
Sportspeople from Ljubljana
Slovenian female tennis players
People from Žiri
People with alopecia universalis